Lawrence Edward McGann (February 2, 1852 – July 22, 1928), born in Dooghcloon, near Attymon, County Galway, Ireland, was a U.S. Representative from Illinois from 1891 to 1895. He was a Chicago Democrat.

Early life
McGann immigrated to the United States in 1855 with his mother a year after his father died. They settled in Milford, MA where he attended the public schools. They moved to Chicago, IL in 1865 and he worked at the boot and shoe trade until 1879 when he was employed as a clerk in the service of the city.

Political career

In 1885 McGann was appointed superintendent of streets January 1, 1885, and served until his resignation in May 1891 when he was elected as a Democrat to the Fifty-second and Fifty-third Congresses. In congress he served as chairman of the Committee on Labor (Fifty-third Congress). In the 1894 election he was at first named the victor by 31 won votes and was seated in the Fifty-fourth Congress where he  served from March 4, 1895, until December 27, 1895. Hugh R. Belknap, who at first count lost the 1894 election, contested it and after a recount showed he had won, McGann conceded the race without an investigation.

McGann went on to a long career in local service and business. He was president of the Chicago General Railways in 1896 and 1897 and was a large investor in the local streetcars. He then served as commissioner of public works of Chicago from 1898-1901 and again from 1911-1915; and city controller from 1901-1907. He resided in Oak Park, IL, until his death in that city on July 22, 1928. He was buried in Mount Olivet Cemetery in Chicago.

References

External links

1852 births
1928 deaths
Politicians from Chicago
Politicians from County Galway
Irish emigrants to the United States (before 1923)
People from Milford, Massachusetts
Democratic Party members of the United States House of Representatives from Illinois
Members of the United States House of Representatives removed by contest